The Mazzanti Evantra is a high-performance limited production sports car made by Italian automobile manufacturer Mazzanti Automobili. The car premiered at the Top Marques Show Monaco in 2013 and has had several subsequent variants produced. The Evantra is produced on commission, in a maximum of five units per year.

Development and production
In 2011 Luca Mazzanti, after three years of design work, supported from the designer Zsolt Tarnok, presented the project "Evantra" which is a mid-engine coupé designed to be produced in a very limited number and customizable according to the customer's specifications. During 2012, Mazzanti developed 1:1 scale models of the Evantra and began the construction of the very first unit. The final test of Evantra happened  in circuit at Autodromo di Modena. In 2013, the Mazzanti Evantra was unveiled in a World premiere during the Top Marques Monaco Show. The name Evantra, as tradition of Mazzanti Automobili, derives from the Etruscan language and it combines the concepts of unity and eternity: historically, Evantra was a name given by the Etruscans to the goddess of immortality. The car is produced in Pontedera, Tuscany, Italy, in a maximum of five units per year

Specifications

Chassis
The boxed steel chassis is joined to a cage of chrome-molybdenum tubes creating the framework inside the vehicle. Another cage connects the engine/gearbox compartment to rear shocks attacks. These solutions contribute significantly to the structural rigidity of the chassis and contribute to occupant safety.

Bodywork
The body is structurally a two-seater coupé. The same body is built in two different types of equipment: pro-body, which made entirely of carbon fiber and one-body, which is built from the same material with some parts built from hand-wrought aluminium.

Interior
The interiors are built to order as per the customer specifications. The sporty central console, has an instrument panel equipped with a multimedia system and data acquisition trim. The engine start button is placed on the integrated bridge to the pavilion in the Mazzanti style as seen on the Antas. The car offers a choice of two driving modes, namely "Race" and "Road".

Engine
But during prototyping and testing, Mazzanti engineers were able to extract a further 50 HP from the engine. The engine has a compression ratio of 11: 1 and is equipped with dry-sump lubrication system, titanium valves and connecting rods.

Performance
The Evantra V8 is equipped with a 6-speed sequential gearbox and can reach a top speed exceeding  with acceleation from 0–100 km/h (62 mph) taking about 3.2 seconds. The aerodynamic development was realised with the support of partners with significant background in F1 and Le Mans. The car is equipped with stock high performance tires 255/30 R20 front and 325/25 R20 rear, mounted on specific 20" OZ Racing wheels, and controlled by a Brembo braking system with carbon-ceramic 380 mm discs and 6-piston calipers at the front and 360 mm discs and 4-piston calipers at the rear.

Variants

Evantra 771

The Evantra 771 was unveiled at the 2016 Bologna Motor Show, as an evolution of the Evantra. Power is sent to the rear wheels via a 7-speed sequential transmission. Stopping power is provided by  rotors with 6-piston calipers at the front and  rotors with 4-piston calipers at the rear, with carbon-ceramic brakes being optional. MacPherson struts at all four corners are responsible for ride stability. Sales began in the spring of 2017, and like all other Mazzanti models was limited to a production run of 5 per year.

Evantra 781
The 781 is an evolution of the 771, replacing the 7.0L LS7 with the same engine found in the Pura, a 6.2L LT2. The suspension has been altered, replacing the MacPherson struts with fully adjustable double wishbone suspension at both front and rear wheels. The 781 retains everything from the 771 apart from the engine & suspension tweaks, and the interior retains its basic layout.

Evantra Millecavalli
The Evantra Millecavalli was unveiled at the 2013 Top Marques Show in Monaco. The 7.0L LS7 found in the 771 has been enlarged to 7.2L, and fitted with a pair of turbochargers, and now produces , hence the name, with Mille meaning thousand & cavalli meaning horses. Again, OZ Racing supplies the wheels which are the same size as the 771 wheels, and are shod with Pirelli Trofeo R tyres, 265/35R19 at the front and 335/30R20 at the rear. Stopping power is provided by  rotors and six-piston calipers at the front, and  rotors and four-piston calipers at the rear, with carbon-ceramic brakes being standard.

Millecavalli R
The R is a high performance variant of the Millecavalli. The OEM tyres are also now Michelin instead of Pirelli.

Evantra Pura

The Evantra Pura was unveiled at the 2021 Florence Biennale art festival in Florence. The Pura is considered the entry model within the Evantra series and has more emphasis on lightness and sheer driving pleasure, in fact the car weighs only , with the chassis being made of high-tensile steel, and molybdenum chrome which allows for flexibility in the corners. The car has MacPherson struts at each corner of the vehicle with fully adjustable suspension as an option. Stopping power is provided by provided by carbon-ceramic Brembos, with 6-piston calipers and  rotors at the front, and 4-piston calipers and  rotors at the rear. Power is sent to the rear wheels via a 7-speed sequential paddle-shift gearbox.

Appearances in other media
The Mazzanti Evantra and Millecavalli are available to play in the desktop/mobile racing game Asphalt 8: Airborne, and the Millecavalli is also available in Asphalt 9: Legends and CSR Racing 2.

Notes

External links

 Official Mazzanti Website

Cars of Italy
Cars introduced in 2013
Rear mid-engine, rear-wheel-drive vehicles
Coupés
Sports cars